Christopher Jeremy Sandford (5 December 1930 – 12 May 2003) was an English television screenwriter who came to prominence in 1966 with Cathy Come Home, his controversial entry in BBC1's The Wednesday Play anthology strand, which was directed by Ken Loach. Later, in 1971, he wrote another successful one-off, Edna, the Inebriate Woman, for The Wednesday Play successor series Play for Today.

Early life
Sandford was born in London and brought up at Eye Manor in Herefordshire, home of his father, Christopher Sandford, who was the owner of the Golden Cockerel Press. His mother was Lettice Sandford. His paternal grandmother was the Anglo-Irish writer Mary Carbery; by her first marriage he had relatives in the Happy Valley set in Kenya.

Sandford was educated at Eton and New College, Oxford, where he read English. During national service, he was a Royal Air Force bandsman.

Career
After his marriage to heiress Nell Dunn in 1957, they gave up their smart Chelsea home and went to live in unfashionable Battersea where they joined and observed the lower strata of society. From this experience he published the play Cathy Come Home in 1963, and she wrote Up the Junction.

In 1968, Sandford won a Jacob's Award for the TV production of Cathy Come Home. He wrote "Smiling David" about the death of David Oluwale.

Sandford became interested in gypsy causes (as his paternal grandmother had been) and for a time edited their news sheet, Romano Drom (Gypsy Road). He travelled the country seeking out gypsy stories, published as The Gypsies, and later reissued as Rokkering to the Gorjios (Talking to the non-Gypsies).

For some time the family lived on a small hill farm called Wern Watkin, outside Crickhowell in South Wales. Their attempt at sheep farming is described by their neighbour, the young Carlo Gébler, son of novelist Edna O'Brien.

Personal life
Jeremy Sandford and his wife Nell Dunn, a granddaughter of the 5th Earl of Rosslyn, had three sons. The couple divorced in 1979.

He married Philippa Finnis in 1988. They had performed "The Raggle Taggle Gypsy" song at an early Mind Body Spirit Festival, and they co-wrote a BBC Radio 4 drama-documentary about the suicide of Jill Hoey.

He died at his home, Hatfield Court in Leominster, Herefordshire, at the age of 72. His last words were: "I think I'll have a rest now."

References

External links
Memorial page to Jeremy Sandford

Fanclub with many of his unpublished writings
Obituary in The Telegraph
The Guardian - Obituary

1930 births
2003 deaths
Military personnel from London
Royal Air Force airmen
Alumni of New College, Oxford
English television writers
Jacob's Award winners
People educated at Eton College
People from Herefordshire
Prix Italia winners
British male television writers
20th-century English screenwriters
20th-century English male writers